Jeremy Cohen may refer to:

 Spike Cohen (born 1982), American political candidate
 Jeremy Cohen (tennis) (1955–2004), American tennis player